Noluthando 'Nolly' Meje Nqayi (born 10 December 1986) is a South African actress and singer. She is best known for her roles in the popular serials Farewell Ella Bella, Swartwater and Silent Witness.

Personal life 
Meje was born on 10 December 1986 in Cape Town, South Africa. She completed her education from Camps Bay High School in Cape Town. Her younger brother, Sobantu Nqayi is also a popular actor in South African television and cinema.

Career
In 2002, Meje reached the top 100 of the first season of the M-Net reality competition Idols. In 2003, she became one of top 12 finalists on the second season, and in 2011, she again contested in the seventh season and became a top 16 finalist.

Meje appeared in several television series such as Shooting Stars, Home Affairs and Interrogation Room. She presented the television shows Destination SA and What's Your Story? In December 2008, she replaced Prudence Moabelo as the host of the third season of the youth talk show Keeping it Real. In 2012, she joined the reality dance competition serial Jam Alley Crew vs Crew as a co-host with Slikour. In the same year, she was invited to act in the comedy series Sketch U Later. In late 2012, she replaced Mac Leshomo as the host of the dance reality competition serial Turn It Out.

On 28 April 2014, Meje joined the popular television soapie Isidingo where she played the role of domestic worker Zukisa Kondile. In 2015, she became the host of the first season of the reality competition The Sing-Off SA. In 2018, she appeared in the film Farewell Ella Bella, in the role of Khanyisa.

Filmography

References

External links
 

Living people
South African television actresses
South African film actresses
1986 births
21st-century South African women singers
People from Cape Town